Triplophysa microps is a species of ray-finned fish in the genus Triplophysa. It is found in shallow streams at the upper reaches of the Yellow, Yangtze, Salween, Mekong, Indus and Brahmaputra Rivers and also in alpine lakes in the Tibetan plateau.

Footnotes 

M
Fish of the Mekong Basin
Fish of Myanmar
Freshwater fish of China
Fish of India
Fish of Pakistan
Fish of Vietnam
Fauna of Tibet
Fish described in 1866